The Bornean shrew (Crocidura foetida) is a species of mammal in the family Soricidae. It is found only on Borneo, throughout most of the island; it may or may not be present in Brunei.

Multilocus phylogenies reveal paraphyly in C. foetida. Individuals from central, south and western Borneo, integrate a monophyletic clade, that diverged around 1 million years ago from a shallow clade which includes individuals from Sabah, plus the Kinabalu shrew, C. baluensis, and the black-footed shrew, C. nigripes (Sulawesi).

References

Mammals described in 1870
Taxa named by Wilhelm Peters